Brandon Domingues (born 6 June 2000) is a French professional footballer who plays as a midfielder for Nemzeti Bajnokság I club Budapest Honvéd.

Career

Troyes
On 25 June 2020, Domingues signed his first professional contract with Troyes. He made his professional debut with the club in a 2–1 Ligue 2 loss to Auxerre on 21 September 2020.

On 30 August 2022, Domingues's contract with Troyes was terminated by mutual consent.

Budapest Honvéd
Domingues joined Nemzeti Bajnokság I club Budapest Honvéd on 1 September 2022, signing a two-year contract with the Hungarian side. He made his debut for the club on 10 September, replacing Dominik Kocsis in the 69th minute of a 0–0 home draw against Kecskemét in the league. In the following league game, on 1 October, Domingues scored his first goal for Honvéd after coming on at half-time in a 4–3 loss to Debrecen. He scored his first brace for the club on 11 February 2023 in the return game against Kecskemét, saving a point for Honvéd in a 2–2 away draw at Széktói Stadion.

References

External links
 
 

2000 births
Living people
21st-century French people
Association football midfielders
Budapest Honvéd FC players
Championnat National 3 players
ES Troyes AC players
Expatriate footballers in Hungary
Footballers from Auvergne-Rhône-Alpes
French expatriate footballers
French expatriate sportspeople in Hungary
French footballers
French people of Portuguese descent
Ligue 1 players
Ligue 2 players
Nemzeti Bajnokság I players
Sportspeople from Grenoble